The 2020 WNBA season was the 24th season for the Los Angeles Sparks of the Women's National Basketball Association. The season will tip off on July 25, 2020, versus the Phoenix Mercury.

This WNBA season will feature an all-time high 36 regular-season games. However, the plan for expanded games was put on hold on April 3, when the WNBA postponed its season due to the COVID-19 pandemic. Under a plan approved on June 15, the league is scheduled to hold a shortened 22-game regular season at IMG Academy, without fans present, starting on July 24.

The Spark's season started slowly, with the team going 3–3 in their first six games.  Every win was followed by a loss during that streak.  Then the team warmed up and won nine games in a row, before losing the last game in August to go into the final month of the season 12–4, and already having secured a playoff berth.  September wasn't kind to the Sparks, as they went 3–3 to finish out the season.  Their final record of 15–7 was good enough for the third seed in the playoffs.

As the third seed, the Sparks were awarded a First Round bye and awaited the lowest remaining seed in the Second Round.  They played the seventh seeded Connecticut Sun and suffered a disappointing 59–73 loss to end their season.

Transactions

WNBA Draft

Trades/Roster Changes

Roster

Game log

Regular season

|- style="background:#bbffbb;"
| 1
| July 25
| Phoenix Mercury
| W 99–76
| N. Ogwumike (21)
| Tied (7)
| Gray (7)
| IMG Academy0
| 1–0
|- style="background:#fcc;"
| 2
| July 28
| Chicago Sky
| 78–96
| Sykes (16)
| Parker (9)
| Gray (7)
| IMG Academy0
| 1–1
|- style="background:#bbffbb;"
| 3
| July 30
| Connecticut Sun
| W 81–76
| Gray (15)
| Parker (11)
| Gray (6)
| IMG Academy0
| 2–1

|- style="background:#fcc;"
| 4
| August 1
| Seattle Storm
| L 75–81
| Parker (19)
| Parker (12)
| Gray (5)
| IMG Academy0
| 2–2
|- style="background:#bbffbb;"
| 5
| August 5
| Indiana Fever
| W 86–75
| Parker (18)
| Parker (11)
| Gray (5)
| IMG Academy0
| 3–2
|- style="background:#fcc;"
| 6
| August 7
| Las Vegas Aces
| L 82–86
| Parker (20)
| Parker (12)
| Tied (4)
| IMG Academy0
| 3–3
|- style="background:#bbffbb;"
| 7
| August 9
| Minnesota Lynx
| W 97–81
| Williams (21)
| Parker (10)
| Parker (9)
| IMG Academy0
| 4–3
|- style="background:#bbffbb;"
| 8
| August 11
| New York Liberty
| W 93–78
| Tied (17)
| Parker (6)
| Tied (4)
| IMG Academy0
| 5-3
|- style="background:#bbffbb;"
| 9
| August 13
| Washington Mystics
| W 81-64
| Williams (13)
| Parker (9)
| Tied (3)
| IMG Academy0
| 6-3
|- style="background:#bbffbb;"
| 10
| August 15
| Indiana Fever
| W 90-76
| Williams (21)
| Tied (5)
| Tied (5)
| IMG Academy0
| 7-3
|- style="background:#bbffbb;"
| 11
| August 19
| Phoenix Mercury
| W 83–74
| 3 tied (16)
| Parker (12)
| Gray (6)
| IMG Academy0
| 8–3
|- style="background:#bbffbb;"
| 12
| August 21
| Atlanta Dream
|  92-85 (OT)
| Gray (20)
| Parker (9)
| Parker (5)
| IMG Academy0
| 9-3
|- style="background:#bbffbb;"
| 13
| August 23
| Dallas Wings
| W 84-81
| Sykes (23)
| Parker (14)
| Parker (6)
| IMG Academy0
| 10-3
|- style="background:#bbffbb;"
| 14
| August 28
| Connecticut Sun
| W 80-76
| Gray (27)
| Cooper (6)
| Parker (7)
| IMG Academy0
| 11-3
|- style="background:#bbffbb;"
| 15
| August 30
| Atlanta Dream
| W 84–79
| Sykes (15)
| Parker (10)
| Parker (7)
| IMG Academy0
| 12–3
|-style="background:#fcc;"
| 16
| August 31
| Minnesota Lynx
| L 78–96
| Gray (18)
| Parker (9)
| Gray (5)
| IMG Academy0
| 12–4

|- style="background:#bbffbb;"
| 17
| September 2
| Dallas Wings
| W 91–83
| Parker (22)
| Parker (10)
| Parker (6)
| IMG Academy0
| 13-4
|-style="background:#fcc;"
| 18
| September 4
| Seattle Storm
| L 90–89
| Parker (25)
| Parker (7)
| ParkerGray (6)
| IMG Academy0
| 13-5
|- style="background:#bbffbb;"
| 19
| September 6
| Chicago Sky
| W 86–80
| Parker (24)
| Parker (15)
| Gray (7)
| IMG Academy0
| 14-5
|- style="background:#bbffbb;"
| 20
| September 8
| New York Liberty
| W 96–70
| Tied (20)
| N.Ogwumike (8)
| Parker (7)
| IMG Academy0
| 15-5
|- style="background:#fcc;"
| 21
| September 10
| Washington Mystics
| L 72–80
| Gray (21)
| Parker (17)
| Parker (6)
| IMG Academy0
| 15–6
|- style="background:#fcc;"
| 22
| September 12
| Las Vegas Aces
| L 70–84
| N.Ogwumike (24)
| Parker (10)
| Gray (11)
| IMG Academy0
| 15–7

Playoffs 

|-style="background:#fcc;"
|1
|September 17
| Connecticut Sun
| L 73–59
| Parker (22)
| Parker (14)
| Parker (5)
| IMG Academy0
| 0–1

Standings

Playoffs

Statistics

Regular season

Awards and honors

References

External links

Los Angeles Sparks at ESPN.com

Los Angeles Sparks seasons
Los Angeles
Los Angeles Sparks